The 7 cm mountain gun was a Japanese ordnance first used in 1883. It was used in the First Sino-Japanese War as the main artillery, and was used again in the Russo-Japanese War by second-line troops .

History 
From 1880, the Imperial Japanese Army wanted to produce guns on its own. With Italian help, the army designed new 75 mm guns.  Because steel was expensive as a raw material in Japan at the time, bronze was used to produce the gun barrel.

References

World War I artillery of Japan
Russo-Japanese war weapons of Japan
Mountain artillery
75 mm artillery